Dafeng District is a coastal district in Yancheng, Jiangsu province, China. The district has the largest national nature reserve for a rare deer species, Père David's Deer or Milu in Chinese. It borders the prefecture-level city of Taizhou to the southwest.

The district nicknamed "the enclave of Shanghai" was a major destination for the sent-down youth from the city. Part of the county was put under Shanghai to establish a municipal farm since 1950, and there are still several farms and two prisons administered by Shanghai at present.

History 
Zhang Jian established Ts'ao-yen-ch'ang Ta-feng Salt&Cultivation Limited Company in 1917, at Caoyan, a town of Dafeng nowadays. The northern Dongtai under the CPC became a separate county in 1942. The county was designated Taipei for its location (north [pei] of Dongtai [abbreviated to tai]). Considering its namesake in Taiwan, it was renamed Dafeng, derived from Zhang's company in 1951.

Geography, resources, and climate

Dafeng borders four counties including Dongtai, Sheyang, Yancheng and Xinghua.

Upon the completion of Sutong Bridge, the district will significantly reduce the driving time to two hours to Shanghai and the south of Jiangsu.

Dafeng has a warm and wet subtropical climate and is influenced by the East Asian monsoon. It has distinct seasons and an abundant sunshine. The average annual temperature is close to 15 °C and the normal precipitation is over 1,000 mm yearly.

Transport
Yancheng Dafeng railway station

Administrative divisions
In the present, Dafeng District has 10 towns.
10 towns

References

External links 

Yancheng
Cities in Jiangsu
County-level divisions of Jiangsu